Moreno Valley Unified School District is the third-largest district in Riverside County, the 23rd largest in California, educating more than 34,000 students in grades TK-12 at 40 schools. It is the fourth-largest employer in Moreno Valley. 

The Superintendent of Schools is Martinrex Kedziora. The President of the Board of Education is Darrell Peeden. District enrollment peaked at over 37,000 in 2006-07 and has since fallen, leading to the shelving of plans for a fifth comprehensive high school.

Graduation rate
 MVUSD's graduation rate had climbed 20% over five years to 86.2%.

Schools

Elementary
Armada
Bear Valley
Box Springs
Butterfield
Chaparral Hills
Cloverdale
Creekside
Edgemont
Hendrick Ranch
Hidden Springs
Honey Hollow
La Jolla
Midland
Moreno
North Ridge
Ramona
Ridge Crest
Seneca
Serrano
Sugar Hill
Sunnymead
Sunnymeadows
TownGate

Middle schools
Badger Springs
Landmark
Mountain View
Palm
Sunnymead
Vista Heights

High schools
Canyon Springs
March Mountain
Moreno Valley
Valley View
Vista Del Lago
Alessandro School K-12 alternative education campus

References

External links
 

School districts in Riverside County, California